Arthur Leslie "Bud" Smith (1919 - 2002) was a Canadian politician in the province of Saskatchewan.  He was elected to the Legislative Assembly of Saskatchewan for the constituency of Moose Jaw South in the 1982 general election, which resulted in a Progressive Conservative government under Premier Grant Devine.

Personal life 

Born in Cardross, Saskatchewan, Smith farmed in the Cardross area for thirty-two years. He then worked as a carpenter, primarily in Moose Jaw.  He was married three times, being predeceased by his first two wives.

Political career 

Smith was long active in the Progressive Conservative Party of Saskatchewan. He stood for election four times, in the general elections of 1975, 1978, 1982 and 1986.  He was defeated in the 1975 and 1978 elections, but elected in the Progressive Conservative landslide of 1982. He was defeated by Lorne Calvert of the New Democratic Party in the 1986 election and retired from provincial politics.

During his term, he was considered a good constituency representative, to the point that Calvert, who defeated him in the 1986 election, was not sure if Calvert's own mother voted for Smith or for him.  Smith's policy interests were improvements in health and social services.  He was the Deputy Government Whip.

Electoral history 

Smith stood for election four times in the riding of Moose Jaw South.  He was defeated in 1975 and 1978, but elected in 1982.  He served one term, being defeated in 1986.

1975 Provincial election:  Moose Jaw South 

 Elected.
X Incumbent.

1978 Provincial election:  Moose Jaw South 

 Elected.
X Incumbent.

1982 Provincial election:  Moose Jaw South 

 Elected.
X Incumbent.

1986 Provincial election:  Moose Jaw South 

 Elected.
X Incumbent. 
1 Rounding error.

References 

1919 births
2002 deaths